5 km may refer to:

5K run
5 km (village)